Kachia Hausa Fulani and Kadara and Jaba is a Local Government Area in the southern part of Kaduna State, Nigeria. Its headquarters are in the town of Kachia. It has an area of 4,570 km and a population of 252,568 in the 2006 census. The postal code of the area is 802.

Boundaries
The Kachia Local Government Area shares boundaries with the Zangon Kataf Local Government Area to the east, the Kajuru Local Government Area to the northeast, the Kagarko Local Government Area to the south, the Jaba Local Government Area to the southeast, the Chikun Local Government Area to the northwest, and Niger State to west, respectively.

Administrative subdivisions
The Kachia Local Government Area consists of 12 subdivisions (second-order administrative divisions) or electoral wards, namely:

Agunu
Ankwa
Awon
Bishini
Dokwa
Gidan Tagwai
Gumel
Kachia
Kateri
Kurmin Musa
Kwaturu
Sabon Sarki (Ghiing)

Population
According to the March 21, 2006 national population census, the Kachia Local Government Area's population was put at 252,568. Its population was projected by the National Population Commission of Nigeria and National Bureau of Statistics to be 340,900 by March 21, 2016.

People
Most of the people of Kachia include the Adara, Gbagyi and Ham. Others include the Bajju, Bakulu, and the Hausa.

Economy
Ginger has become a major economic crop of the Kachia Local Government Area due to the high yield of the root crop in the land. Other agro-products include corn, sorghum, millet and soybeans.

Kachia town is also one of the largest towns in southern Kaduna state where various small and medium scale businesses contribute to the economy of the state and country at large.

Religion
Christianity has the largest number of adherents in the Kachia Local Government Area. Islam is also practiced, while the African Traditional religion has an ever increasing number of adherents.

Notable people
 Martin Luther Agwai, military personnel

References

External links

Local Government Areas in Kaduna State